Cyrus Cassells (born 1957) is an American poet and professor.

Life and work
Cassells was born in Dover, Delaware, grew up in the Mojave Desert north of Los Angeles, and began writing poetry in high school. He graduated in 1979 from Stanford University with a degree in film and broadcasting, and landed a job creating poetry filmstrips in the film division of a publishing house, where he was working when poet Al Young called to tell him that his manuscript had been selected for publication from the 1981 National Poetry Series competition. He then went on to win the 1981 National Poetry Series competition. He has worked as a translator, film critic, actor, and teacher. Since 1998, he has taught poetry at Texas State University in the MFA creative writing program.  He lives in Austin.

Cassells' collection More Than Peace and Cypresses (Copper Canyon Press), and his fifth book, The Crossed-Out Swastika, (2012) were published by Copper Canyon Press. He has won many awards including a 1995 Pushcart Prize, the Lambda Literary Award, and the William Carlos Williams Award.  His collection Soul Make A Path Through Shouting was nominated in 1994 for the Pulitzer Prize in Poetry.  Cassell's poems have appeared in numerous anthologies and in such journals as Ploughshares Indiana Review, AGNI, The Literati Quarterly, Boston Review, Icarus, and Callaloo.

He is out as gay.

Poetry collections
 Is There Room for Another Horse on Your Horse Ranch? (Four Way Books, 2024)
To The Cypress Again and Again: Tribute to Salvador Espriu (Stephen F. Austin State University Press, 2023) (writer and translator)
 The World That the Shooter Left Us(Four Way Books, 2022)
 More Than Watchmen at Daybreak (Nine Mile Books, 2020)
 Still Life with Children: Selected Poems of Francesc Parcerisas (Stephen F. Austin State University Press, 2019) (translator)
 The Gospel according to Wild Indigo (Southern Illinois University Press, 2018)
 The Crossed-Out Swastika (Copper Canyon Press, 2012)
 More Than Peace and Cypresses (Copper Canyon Press, 2004)
 Beautiful Signor (Copper Canyon Press, 1997)
 Soul Make a Path Through Shouting (Copper Canyon Press, 1994)
 The Mud Actor (Holt, Rhinehart and Winston, 1982)

Honors and awards
2022 Poet Laureate Fellowship from The Academy of American Poets 
2021 Presidential Excellence Award from Texas State University
2021 Poet Laureate of Texas
 2020 Civitella Rainieri Fellowship
 2020 The Texas Institute of Letters Souerette Diehl Fraser Award for Best Translated Book for Still Life with Children: Selected Poems of Francesc Parcerisas
 2019 Guggenheim Foundation Fellowship
 2019 Pulitzer Prize nomination for Criticism for cultural reviews in The Washington Spectator
 2019 Finalist, The National Poetry Series for Is There Room For Another Horse on Your Horse Ranch?
 2019 Artist in Residence, Helene Wurlitzer Foundation of Taos, New Mexico 
 2019 Resident Fellowship, Mabel Dodge Foundation 
 2019 Finalist, NAACP Image Award for Outstanding Work of Literature—Poetry for The Gospel according to Wild Indigo 
 2019 Finalist, Texas Institute of Letters Helen C. Smith Memorial Award for Best Book of Poetry for The Gospel according to Wild Indigo
 2019 Finalist, Balcones Prize for Outstanding Poetry Book of 2018 for The Gospel according to Wild Indigo
 2014 Resident Fellowship, Lannan Foundation, Marfa, Texas
 2012 Finalist, Balcones Prize for Outstanding Poetry Book of 2012 for The Crossed-Out Swastika
 2008 Resident Fellowship, Lannan Foundation, Marfa, Texas
 2006 Rockefeller Foundation Fellowship
 2005 NEA Literature Fellowship in Poetry
 2004 Library Journal Best Poetry Books of the Year for More Than Peace and Cypresses
 2004 Lannan Literary Selection Book for More Than Peace and Cypresses
 1997 Finalist, Bay Area Book Reviewers Award for Beautiful Signor
 1997 Lambda Literary Award for Beautiful Signor
 1997 Sister Circle Book Award for Beautiful Signor
 1995 Pushcart Prize
 1995 Finalist, Lenore Marshall Prize for Soul Make a Path through Shouting
 1994 Publishers Weekly Best Poetry Books of the Year for Soul Make a Path through Shouting
 1994 William Carlos Williams Award for Soul Make a Path Through Shouting
 1993 Rockefeller Foundation Fellowship
 1993 Lannan Literary Award - Poetry
 1992 Peter I.B. Lavan Younger Poet Award
 1992 Finalist, AWP Poetry Prize for Soul Make a Path through Shouting
 1986 NEA Literature Fellowship in Poetry
 1984 Artist in Residence, Helene Wurlitzer Foundation of Taos, New Mexico 
 1983 Finalist, Bay Area Book Reviewers Award finalist for The Mud Actor
 1982-83 Resident Fellowship, Fine Arts Work Center, Provincetown, Massachusetts 
 1981 National Poetry Series Prize for The Mud Actor

References

External links
 Texas State University > MFA Faculty
 Academy of American Poets > Poet: Cyrus Cassells Bio
 Texas State University > Rising Star: Cyrus Cassells Continues to Form Cultural Legacy as “A Poet of Witness By Amy Francisco

1957 births
Living people
American male poets
20th-century American poets
English-language poets
Texas State University faculty
Poets from Delaware
Stanford University alumni
People from Dover, Delaware
Lambda Literary Award for Gay Poetry winners
21st-century American poets
African-American poets
LGBT African Americans
American LGBT poets
LGBT people from Delaware
American gay writers
Gay academics
20th-century American male writers
21st-century American male writers
20th-century African-American writers
21st-century African-American writers
21st-century American LGBT people
African-American male writers
Gay poets